The Bloomsbury Gang, also known as the Bedford party, was a political party formed in the United Kingdom in 1765 by John Russell, 4th Duke of Bedford.  The group took its name from Bloomsbury, a district of central London now in the London Borough of Camden.

Political parties established in 1765
History of Great Britain
History of the London Borough of Camden
Defunct political parties in the United Kingdom
1765 establishments in Great Britain
Gang